Whitwell Station, on the Ventnor West branch of the Isle of Wight Central Railway, was opened on 20 July 1897 along with the other stations on the branch (with the exception of Ventnor West which opened in 1900). It was equipped with a passing loop, two platforms, a signal box and a substantial station building.

History 
The station was opened on 20 July 1897, and was originally named Whitwell. At the time of opening the route was popular featuring a passing loop and two platforms, the only station on the line to have this. It was renamed Whitwell Halt on 1 July 1941.

Stationmasters
James Cooper ca. 1899
Samuel John Urry ca. 1907 (afterwards station master at Freshwater)
F. Newland from 1908 (formerly station master at Freshwater)
Mr. Hawkins ca. 1935

Present 

The station is now a private dwelling house, but a good deal of its original railway-station features remain, such as the waiting shelter on the old up platform, which has been restored.

Location 
Unlike neighbouring Godshill, the station was closer to the community it was meant to serve. It also served the nearby villages of Niton and Chale.

Other stations on the branch 

The other stations on the Ventnor West branch were:
 Merstone (where the branch joined the Newport-Sandown line)
 Godshill
 St Lawrence (the original terminus of the line from 1897 to 1900)
 Ventnor West

References

External links 
 Subterranea Britannica: SB-Sites: Whitwell Station

Disused railway stations on the Isle of Wight
Former Isle of Wight Central Railway stations
Railway stations in Great Britain opened in 1897
Railway stations in Great Britain closed in 1952